Calcium bromide is the name for compounds with the chemical formula CaBr2(H2O)x.  Individual compounds include the anhydrous material (x = 0), the hexahydrate (x = 6), and the rare dihydrate (x = 2). All are white powders that dissolve in water, and from these solutions crystallizes the hexahydrate. The hydrated form is mainly used in some drilling fluids.

Synthesis, structure, and reactions
It is produced by the reaction of calcium oxide, calcium carbonate with hydrobromic acid or the reaction of calcium metal with elemental bromine.

It adopts the rutile structure, featuring octahedral Ca centres bound to six bromide anions, which also bridge to other Ca centres.

When strongly heated in air, calcium bromide will react with oxygen to produce calcium oxide and bromine:
2 CaBr2 + O2 → 2 CaO + 2 Br2
In this reaction, the oxygen oxidizes the bromide to bromine.

Uses
It is mainly used as dense aqueous solutions for drilling fluids.   It is also used in neuroses medication, freezing mixtures, food preservatives, photography and fire retardants.

Calcium bromide has been shown to undergo complexation with triphenylphosphine oxide, allowing for removal of triphenylphosphine oxide from reaction mixtures without the use of chromatography.

References

External links
 Calcium bromide at WebElements
 MSDS

Calcium compounds
Bromides
Alkaline earth metal halides